Jay Bell (born February 19, 1977) is an American writer and the author of the Something Like... series. The first novel in the series, Something like Summer, was adapted into a feature film by Blue Seraph Productions under the direction of David Berry and screenwriter Carlos Pedraza.

Personal life 
A native of Kansas, Bell moved to Germany where he lived for ten years with his husband, artist and industrial designer Andreas Bell. The couple now live in Chicago.

Awards and honors
In 2012, Something Like Summer was included in Amazon's Best Books of 2011: Gay & Lesbian list, and nominated for to the 24th Lambda Literary Awards in the category of Gay Romance

In 2013, Bell won the 25th Lambda Literary Awards in the category of Gay Romance for his novel Kamikaze Boys.

Publications

Something like... series 

 Book 1: Something Like Summer (2011)
 Book 2: Something Like Winter (2012)
 Book 3: Something Like Autumn (2013) 
 Book 4: Something Like Spring (2014)
 Book 5: Something Like Lightning (2014)
 Book 6: Something Like Thunder (2015)
 Book 7: Something Like Stories - Volume 1 (2016) 
 Book 8: Something Like Rain (2016)
 Book 9: Something Like Stories - Volume 2 (2017) 
 Book 10: Something Like Forever (2017)
 Book 11: Something Life Stories - Volume 3 (2020)
 Companion story: Something Like Fall (2015)

Loka Legends series 

 Story: Finding Fire
 Book 1: The Cat in the Cradle
 Story: Flesh and Blood
 Book 2: From Darkness to Darkness

Other work 

 Kamikaze Boys
 Hell's Pawn
 Language Lessons
 Like and Subscribe
 Straight Boy
 The Boy At the Bottom of the Fountain
 Out of Time, Into You

References

External links 
 Jay Bell Books

Lambda Literary Award winners
American male novelists
21st-century American novelists
LGBT people from Illinois
American gay writers
American expatriates in Germany
American LGBT novelists
Living people
American romantic fiction novelists
21st-century American male writers
1977 births